Zhu Xian or Zhuxian may refer to:

Literature and media
Zhu Xian (novel), 2005 Chinese novel by Xiao Ding
Jade Dynasty (video game), video game adaptation
Jade Dynasty (film), 2019 film adaptation

Places in China
Zhuxian, Henan, in Kaifeng, Henan
Zhuxian Township, in Wushan County, Chongqing